Malinois is a French adjective referring to something derived from or related to Mechelen, a city in Belgium. It may also refer to:
Malinois dog
K.V. Mechelen, a football club formerly (and nowadays informally) known by its French name of FC Malinois.
Malinois, a French word for a person who is from Mechelen.